Padmodaya Public Model  Secondary School (PPMSS) is both English and Nepali medium co-educational school established in 2004 BS. The School has been declared as Model Public Secondary School with well managed teaching and learning environment in 2062 BS.

It runs from Nursery to Grade 12 including CTEVT Annex Program from 2059 BS. It focuses on both foundation and college level students with quality education. Understanding the importance of English language, it has both English and Nepali medium instruction in teaching. The school offers Diploma in Automobile Engineering with the affiliation from CTEVT."

Courses Offered
 General Education
 Science Faculty
 Management Faculty
 Education Faculty
 Computer Stream/Trade

CTEVT
 Diploma in Electronic 
 Junior Computer Technician
 Diploma in Electrical Sub-overseas
 TSLC
 Social Mobilization

Award
Padmodaya Public Model Secondary School has been awarded with international school award 2015-2018 by British Council, Nepal. The school was qualified for embedding international dimension in the curriculum and enhancing 21st Century Core skills among the students.

References

Secondary schools in Nepal